Elisabeth Stephanie Clemens is an American sociologist, who is currently the William Rainey Harper Distinguished Service Professor of Sociology and the college at the University of Chicago. Clemens's research is focused on social movements, organizations, and American political development. As of 2016, Clemens has served as editor-in-chief of the American Journal of Sociology.

Education and career 
Clemens holds a bachelor's degree in social studies from Harvard University, and in 1990 she graduated from the University of Chicago with a PhD in sociology. At the University of Chicago, Clemens completed her dissertation supervised by Theda Skocpol, Wendy Griswold, and Edward O. Laumann.

From 1990 to 2002, Clemens was a professor at the University of Arizona, before returning to her alma mater the University of Chicago as professor sociology in 2002. Clemens served as department chair from 2012 to 2015, and from 2012 to 2013 she served as president of the Social Science History Association. In 2016, Clemens assumed the role of editor-in-chief of the American Journal of Sociology, the discipline's first journal in the United States, from Andrew Abbott who had held the position since 2000.

The People's Lobby 
Clemens's first book The People's Lobby: Organizational Innovation and the Rise of Interest Group Politics in the United States, 1890–1925, which derived from her dissertation research, argues that beginning in the late nineteenth century American politics was transformed from a system oriented around political party organizations and elections to one oriented around interest groups. This shift was instigated by what Clemens refers to as 'the people's lobby', groups of citizens and voters that influenced party politics through novel forms of civic engagement, which bypassed traditional political processes. Clemens investigates the emergence of the people's lobby across the American states California, Washington, and Wisconsin, arguing that federalism allowed for distinct regional variations. The book was awarded the American Sociological Association's Section on Organizations, Occupations, and Work's Max Weber Book award in 1998 as well as the Political Sociology Section's Outstanding Contribution to Political Sociology award in 1999.

Clemens's research developed in The People's Lobby is regarded as engaging with theories of sociological institutions with a focus on organizational innovation. Her scholarship on institutions has been discussed in reviews of sociological literature on social movements and institutionalism.

Bibliography

Sole-authored books

Co-edited books

References

External links 
 Elisabeth S. Clemens, University Chicago Faculty Homepage 
 

Year of birth missing (living people)
Living people
Harvard College alumni
University of Chicago alumni
University of Arizona faculty
University of Chicago faculty
Political sociologists
American women sociologists
American women political scientists
American political scientists
20th-century American women writers
20th-century social scientists
21st-century social scientists
21st-century American women writers
American Journal of Sociology editors